Joseph Frank (October 6, 1918 – February 27, 2013) was an American literary scholar and leading expert on the life and work of Russian novelist Fyodor Dostoevsky. Frank's five-volume biography of Dostoevsky is frequently cited among the major literary biographies of the 20th century.

Biography
Joseph Frank was born Joseph Nathaniel Glassman on the Lower East Side of Manhattan in 1918. His father died when he was young, his mother remarried William Frank, and the family moved to Brooklyn.

Frank attended classes at New York University in the 1930s and the University of Wisconsin–Madison in the early 1940s, but never earned a Bachelor's degree. Frank went to Paris on a Fulbright Scholarship in 1950, and in 1952 he was accepted by the Committee on Social Thought at the University of Chicago, where he eventually earned a Ph.D. In 1953, he married mathematician Marguerite Frank.

He taught at the University of Minnesota and Rutgers, and was a professor of comparative literature at Princeton from 1966 to 1985. He finished his teaching career at Stanford.

Frank died of pulmonary failure in 2013,  survived by his wife and their two daughters.

Work
Frank began work on his Dostoevsky biography in the 1970s. Originally conceived as a single volume, it ultimately grew to five volumes totaling more than 2,400 pages. A single condensed version of the five volumes was published in 2010 under the title Dostoevsky: A Writer in His Time. It has been called the best biography of Dostoevsky in any language, including Russian. As a scholar of comparative literature, Frank earned honors including the Modern Language Association's James Russell Lowell Prize (1977 and 1986) and the Distinguished Contributions Award of the American Association for the Advancement of Slavic Studies (2008).

In 2019, Princeton University Press published Lectures on Dostoevsky, a collection of Frank's never-before-published Stanford lectures on Dostoevsky's major works.

References

1918 births
2013 deaths
Literary scholars
Fyodor Dostoyevsky
Fulbright alumni